St. John Cantius Roman Catholic Church, Philadelphia, is located in Northeast Philadelphia in Bridesburg and serves the local Polish-speaking population in the area. It is located at 4415 Almond Street.

The chapel is next to the church on Thompson Street. Sunday Masses are celebrated in the chapel from June to September. Daily Masses are also celebrated in the chapel.

All Saints Parish and St. John Cantius Parish merged to become a new parish at the site of St. John Cantius, with All Saints Church remaining “a worship site for the time being,” according to a statement by the archdiocese.

History
The parish was founded in 1892 and the church was built in 1898.

Parish schooling
Schooling for children is at Blessed Trinity Regional Catholic School, 3033 Levick Street, Philadelphia, PA  19149.

Services in Polish
Mass is celebrated at 11:30 a.m. in Polish on Sunday, and at 8 a.m. on Saturday.

Services in English
Mass is celebrated in English at 4:30 p.m. on Saturday; 8:00 a.m. and 10:00 a.m. on Sunday; and at 8:00 a.m. on Monday to Friday.

Additional services
Holy Day Vigil: 7:00 p.m. [English], 9 a.m. (English), 7 p.m. (Polish)
Confessions: Sat: 3:30 to 4:15 p.m.
Devotions: Rosary, Tue: 6:30 p.m.
Adoration: Wednesday: 4-7 pm
 Miraculous Medal Novena: Mondays from October to June 6:30 pm

Contact information
Pastor: Rev. Mark S Kunigonis
Business manager: 
R.C.I.A. minister: 
Parish secretary: 
Address: 4415 Almond St., Philadelphia, PA 19137

References

Roman Catholic churches in Philadelphia
History of Catholicism in the United States
1892 establishments in Pennsylvania
Bridesburg, Philadelphia
Churches completed in 1898